The Wages of Fear is a 1953 French thriller film directed by Henri-Georges Clouzot, starring Yves Montand, and based on the 1950 French novel Le Salaire de la peur (lit. "The Salary of Fear") by Georges Arnaud. When an oil well owned by an American company catches fire, the company hires four European men, down on their luck, to drive two trucks over mountain dirt roads, loaded with nitroglycerine needed to extinguish the flames.

The film brought Clouzot international fame—winning both the Golden Bear and the Palme d'Or at the 1953 Berlin Film Festival and Cannes Film Festival, respectively—and enabled him to direct Les Diaboliques (1955). In France, it was the fourth highest-grossing film of the year with a total of nearly 7 million admissions.

Plot
Frenchmen Mario and Jo, German Bimba and Italian Luigi are stuck in the isolated town of Las Piedras. Surrounded by desert, the town is linked to the outside world only by an airstrip, but the airfare is beyond the means of the men. There is little opportunity for employment aside from the American corporation that dominates the town, Southern Oil Company (SOC), which operates the nearby oil fields and owns a walled compound within the town. SOC exploits local workers and takes the law into its own hands, but the townspeople depend on it and suffer in silence.

Mario is a sarcastic Corsican playboy who treats his devoted lover, Linda, with disdain. Jo is an aging ex-gangster who recently found himself stranded in the town. Bimba is an intense, quiet man whose father was murdered by the Nazis and who himself worked for three years in a salt mine. Luigi, Mario's roommate, is a jovial, hardworking man, who has just learned that he is dying from cement dust in his lungs. Mario befriends Jo due to their common background, having lived in Paris, but a rift develops between Jo and the other cantina regulars due to his combative, arrogant personality.

A massive fire erupts at one of the SOC oil fields. The only way to extinguish the flames and cap the well is an explosion produced by nitroglycerine. With short notice and lack of proper equipment, it must be transported within jerrycans placed in two large trucks from the SOC headquarters, 500 km (300 miles) away. Due to the poor condition of the roads and the highly volatile nature of nitroglycerine, the job is considered too dangerous for the unionized SOC employees.

The company foreman, Bill O'Brien, recruits truck drivers from the local community. Despite the dangers, many of the locals volunteer, lured by the high pay: US$2,000 per driver. This is a fortune to them, perhaps the only way out of their dead-end lives. The pool of applicants is narrowed down to four drivers: Mario, Bimba and Luigi are chosen, along with a German named Smerloff. Smerloff fails to appear on the appointed day, so Jo, who knows O' Brien from his bootlegging days, takes his place. The other drivers suspect that Jo intimidated Smerloff in some way to facilitate his own hiring.

Jo and Mario transport the nitroglycerin in one vehicle; Luigi and Bimba are in the other, with thirty minutes separating them in order to limit potential casualties. The drivers are forced to deal with a series of physical and mental obstacles, including a stretch of extremely rough road called "the washboard", a construction barricade that forces them to teeter around a rotten platform above a precipice, and a boulder blocking the road. Jo finds that his nerves are not what they used to be, and the others confront Jo about his increasing cowardice. Finally, Luigi and Bimba's truck explodes without warning, killing them both.

Mario and Jo arrive at the scene of the explosion only to find a large crater rapidly filling with oil from a pipeline ruptured in the blast. Jo exits the vehicle to help Mario navigate through the oil-filled crater. The truck, however, is in danger of becoming bogged down and, during their frantic attempts to prevent it from getting stuck, Mario runs over Jo. Although the vehicle is ultimately freed from the muck, Jo is mortally injured. On their arrival at the oil field, Mario and Jo are hailed as heroes, but Jo is dead and Mario collapses from exhaustion. Upon his recovery, he heads home in the same truck. He collects double the wages following his friends' deaths and refuses the chauffeur offered by SOC. Mario jubilantly drives down a mountain road as a party is being held at the cantina back in town, where Mario's friends eagerly await his arrival. He swerves recklessly and intentionally, having cheated death so many times on the same road. Linda, dancing in the cantina, faints. Mario takes a corner too fast and plunges through the guardrail to his death.

Cast
 Yves Montand as Mario
 Charles Vanel as Jo
 Folco Lulli as Luigi
 Peter van Eyck as Bimba
 Véra Clouzot as Linda
 William Tubbs as Bill O'Brien
 Darío Moreno as Hernandez
 Jo Dest as Smerloff
 Luis De Lima as Bernardo
 Antonio Centa as Camp Chief
 Darling Légitimus as Rosa

Reception and legacy
The Wages of Fear was critically hailed upon its original release. Bosley Crowther of The New York Times wrote "The excitement derives entirely from the awareness of nitroglycerine and the gingerly, breathless handling of it. You sit there waiting for the theatre to explode." The film was also a hit with the public, selling 6,944,306 tickets in France where it was the fourth highest earning film of the year.

In 1982, Pauline Kael called it "an existential thriller—the most original and shocking French melodrama of the 50s. ... When you can be blown up at any moment only a fool believes that character determines fate. ... If this isn't a parable of man's position in the modern world, it's at least an illustration of it. ... The violence ... is used to force a vision of human existence." In 1992, Roger Ebert stated that "The film's extended suspense sequences deserve a place among the great stretches of cinema." Leonard Maltin awarded the film  out of 4 stars, calling it a "marvelously gritty and extremely suspenseful epic".
In 2010, the film was ranked No. 9 in Empires "The 100 Best Films Of World Cinema." The website Rotten Tomatoes reported that 100% of critics have given the film a positive review based on 47 reviews, with a weighted average of 8.90/10. Its critics consensus reads: "An existential suspense classic, The Wages of Fear blends nonstop suspense with biting satire; its influence is still being felt on today's thrillers." Metacritic reports a score of 85 out of 100 based on 15 critic reviews, indicating "universal acclaim".

The British-American filmmaker Christopher Nolan was strongly influenced by The Wages of Fear for his film Dunkirk.

The film was drastically cut for its 1955 U.S. release, losing around 35 minutes of its original running time. This included the cutting of several scenes giving a negative portrayal of the fictional American oil company "SOC" after the film was accused of anti-Americanism.

Restoration and home video
One of the best known and most successful of Clouzot's films, The Wages of Fear has been widely released on every home video format. However, with the exception of a French DVD (TF1 Vidéo, 2001) featuring the original 153-minute French theatrical version, until recently most releases only contained a slightly edited 148-minute version. A comprehensive 4K restoration, based on the original negative and supervised by cinematographer Guillaume Schiffman, was completed in 2017. It has greatly improved audio and video quality, and has been released on Blu-ray, DVD and DCP in France, (TF1 Vidéo), the UK (BFI) and Japan (IVC).

The film was colorized in 1996 with the approval of Clouzot's daughter. It was subsequently broadcast on French television and released on French VHS.

Awards
The film is unique in that it won both the Golden Bear and the Palme d'Or.

 1953 Berlin Film Festival: Golden Bear
 1953 Cannes Film Festival: Grand Prix du Festival International du Film (Palme d'Or)
 1954 BAFTA Award: Best Film

Remakes
Violent Road (aka Hell's Highway), directed by Howard W. Koch in 1958, and Sorcerer, directed by William Friedkin in 1977, are American remakes, although the former is not credited as such. Friedkin described the latter as an adaptation of the original novel.

The plot was adapted for an episode of the 1980s American TV series MacGyver, "Hellfire" (S01E08).

References

External links
 
 
 
 
 The Wages of Fear: No Exit an essay by Dennis Lehane at the Criterion Collection

1953 films
1950s adventure drama films
1950s psychological drama films
1950s psychological thriller films
French black-and-white films
French adventure drama films
French thriller drama films
1950s French-language films
French adventure thriller films
Golden Bear winners
Italian thriller drama films
Films scored by Georges Auric
Films about death
Films about friendship
Films based on French novels
Films based on thriller novels
Films directed by Henri-Georges Clouzot
Films produced by Raymond Borderie
Films set in South America
Palme d'Or winners
Trucker films
Best Film BAFTA Award winners
Italian road movies
Films with screenplays by Henri-Georges Clouzot
1950s thriller drama films
1953 drama films
French road movies
1950s Italian films
1950s French films